The Anglican Church of St Bartholomew  in Rodhuish, Somerset, England was built in the 15th century. It is a Grade II* listed building.

History

The church was built as a chapel of ease in the 15th century. It has been revised and reroofed in the 16th, 18th and 20th centuries.

The parish of Withycombe with Rodhuish is part of the benefice of Dunster, Carhampton, Withycombe with Roduish, Timberscombe and Wootton Courtenay within the Diocese of Bath and Wells.

Architecture

The stone building has a slate roof and consists of a nave, chancel and small single stage west bell tower.

The interior has carved chairs depicting biblical scenes which were made in the late 16th or early 17th century and a wooden ambry. The circular font is Norman.

References

Grade II* listed buildings in West Somerset
Grade II* listed churches in Somerset